Brezje nad Kamnikom is a settlement in the Municipality of Kamnik in the Upper Carniola region of Slovenia.

Geography
Brezje nad Kamnikom lies on the northwest slope of Vovar Hill on a level sun-exposed ridge. The soil is shallow and loamy. There is a natural cave under the village, with the entrance along the road to Vodice nad Kamnikom.

Name
Brezje nad Kamnikom was attested in written sources as Bresyach in 1368 and Nabresy in 1499, among other spellings. The name of the settlement was changed from Brezje to Brezje nad Kamnikom (literally, 'Brezje above Kamnik') in 1953.

Cultural heritage

A chapel shrine in Brezje nad Kamnikom has been registered as cultural heritage. The shrine stands along the old road from Godič to Brezje nad Kamnikom. It is a closed chapel-shrine (kapelica zaprtega tipa) with a quatrefoil ornament on the gable. The semicircular niche contains a wooden crucifix. The shrine dates from 1852.

References

External links 

Brezje nad Kamnikom on Geopedia

Populated places in the Municipality of Kamnik